Jordan Cunico (born 7 May 1996) is a professional Australian rules footballer who played for the Geelong Football Club in the Australian Football League (AFL). He was drafted by Geelong with their fourth selection and fifty-ninth overall in the 2014 national draft. He made his debut in the two point win against  at Simonds Stadium in round ten of the 2017 season.

References

External links

 

1996 births
Living people
Geelong Football Club players
Gippsland Power players
Box Hill Football Club players
Australian rules footballers from Victoria (Australia)
Australian people of Italian descent